The 1996–97 Vyshcha Liha season was the 6th since its establishment. FC Dynamo Kyiv were the defending champions.

Preseason changes
Number of teams in the league was reduced from 18 to 16. Vyshcha Liha became a member of the newly established Professional Football League of Ukraine.

Teams

Promotions
Vorskla Poltava, the champion of the 1995–96 Ukrainian First League  – (debut)

Renamed
Before the start of season CSKA-Borysfen Kyiv was renamed to CSKA Kyiv. Just before the start of new 1996–97 season a scandal took place related to ownership. Dmytro Zlobenko was removed from the club which with help of the Army was passed to some businessman by name of Mikhail Grinshpon, a president of "Kiev–Donbass".<ref name=skeinf170717>Varis, S. Mikhail Grinshpon: astronomical "partitioner" of Ukraine. Part 1. (Михаил Гриншпон: космический «распильщик» Украины. ЧАСТЬ 1). Skelet Info. 17 July 2017</ref> Concurrently, Mikhail Grinshpon was an adviser to the Ukrainian Minister of Defense Oleksandr Kuzmuk.

Location

ManagersNotes:'' Games between Dynamo Kyiv and CSKA Kyiv were played at the Republican Stadium.

Changes

League table

Results

Top goalscorers

See also
 1996–97 Ukrainian First League
 1996–97 Ukrainian Second League
 1996–97 Ukrainian Cup

References

External links
ukrsoccerhistory.com - source of information

Ukrainian Premier League seasons
1996–97 in Ukrainian association football leagues
Ukra